Al Moses Manerson is an artist manager, songwriter and producer who specializes in A&R, promotions, marketing, sales and production. He is the founder and CEO of BluRaffe Entertainment Group, a New York based music & multi-media firm, as well as president and CEO of Red Velvet Inc., a boutique bi-coastal management & consulting company.

Prior to joining Red Velvet in 2003, Manerson was general manager of Real Deal Entertainment, SVP of marketing and promotions for Platinum Records, interim VP of promotions and marketing of Epic Records, national director of retail for Columbia Records and Northeast regional gospel promoter for A&M Records.

Manerson has marketed and promoted Gold, Platinum and multi-Platinum albums in the pop, gospel, dance, reggae, R&B, hip-hop, rap, Christian and folk genres. He's worked with musical artists Mariah Carey, Run-DMC, Beastie Boys, Michael Jackson, Janet Jackson, LL Cool J, Sade, Gloria Estefan, Babyface, Public Enemy, Ghostface Killah, Cam'ron, Sandy Patty, Michael W. Smith, Shirley Caesar, Mighty Clouds of Joy, Shabba Ranks, Barry White, Luther Vandross and countless others.

Personal life
Manerson was born in Roxbury, Mass., and attended the Lee Institute School of Real Estate in Boston. He continued his education at Fitchburg State University in Fitchburg, Mass., where he graduated with a bachelor's degree in marketing and labor relations. In 2010 he was awarded a Certificate of Leadership by the UNCF.

Present
Al Manerson founded BluRaffe Entertainment Group in 2013 and is currently the CEO. BluRaffe Entertainment specializes in music, TV & film, publishing, distribution, and consulting. Artists include Stokley Williams, of the R&B group Mint condition, singing/songwriting duo SHAKESPEARE, producer S-Dot, and others. BluRaffe artists including Manerson have written, recorded, and/or produced several successful projects. Presently, Manerson's artist Stokely is set to close a deal with legendary producers/songwriters Jimmy Jam and Terry Lewis by way of BluRaffe Entertainment/Flyte Tyme Productions. Manerson is the Music Supervisor for the 2019 Robin Bissell (The Hunger Games (film)) directorial debut of Best of Enemies, starring Taraji P. Henson and Sam Rockwell.

Manerson advised and lent his expertise to super producer Rodney Jerkins's music venture, Evolve/Capitol Music Group.  Artists include actor Evan Ross.

In 2013, Zendaya, Disney's 1st black tween star released her self-titled debut album. Manerson was an executive producer and her debut single, “Replay”, was certified Platinum and sold over 1.2 million copies. Manerson facilitated the collaboration between, hip-hop artist, Wale (rapper) and Stokley. From that partnership was the production of Wale's certified Gold album, The Gifted (2013).

In 2010, Manerson was involved in securing a recording contract with Concord Music Group/Universal Records for singer/songwriter Leela James. He's was her manager and executive produced her album, My Soul. James’ single, "Tell Me You Love Me," was viewed over half a million times on YouTube. Manerson negotiated her position as host of the BET series My Black is Beautiful.

Also in 2010, Manerson began managing Kadis & Sean, Audio Push and Mint Condition.

-Kadis & Sean: Manerson was involved in securing a production deal with Geffen/Interscope for the duo's Roz Music Entertainment, and a publishing deal with Chrysalis Music Group, for their first original score as music producers for the movie Honey 2 through Universal Pictures, and song placements with Jesse McCartney, JoJo and T. Mills. He negotiated television and soundtrack placements and oversaw the opening of Roz Music studios.

-Audio Push: Manerson was involved in securing the group's record deal with Roz Music Entertainment under Geffen/Interscope. He served as executive producer for their debut album, garnered song placements for Xbox and the soundtrack to Honey 2.

-Mint Condition: As the group's manager, Manerson was involved in securing their deal with Shanachie/E1 for their album, 7. Manerson was executive producer of the album and oversaw the band's in-store campaigns and marketing brand. He was involved in securing a contract with top booking agency CAA and placed Mint Condition as house band for the television series Way Black When and as hosts of the series’ Best Of episodes.

In 2009, Al Manerson was involved in securing a distribution deal through Make Entertainment/EMI for R&B artist Kevon Edmonds, whom he represented. With Manerson as A&R for Edmonds’ Who Knew album, the single "Oh" charted in the Adult Contemporary Top 10.

That same year, Manerson supervised the soundtrack for Waiting in Beijing (IMDb credited), and was involved in garnering a distribution deal with K-tel Records Canada for Billy Blanks, and a distribution deal for The Dream Center through Universal Distribution for Christian rock band Press Play.

Manerson also managed Governor, the first male R&B artist signed to G-Note Records, the label founded and owned by 50 Cent.

Accomplishments
Achieved over $100 million in sales for Epic/Sony.
Tripled sales in A&M Records gospel division.
Established Platinum Records artist roster.
Secured distribution deal for Real Deal Entertainment and Orpheus EMI.
Former chairman of the board of the Atlanta Entertainment Committee. 
Former member of the National Black Radio Coalition.

Career Highlights
General Manager - Real Deal Entertainment, Atlanta, Ga. 2001-2002

Senior Vice President of Marketing and Promotions - Platinum Records, Atlanta, Ga. 1998-2000

Vice President and Interim Vice President of Promotions and Marketing - Epic/550/Sony and Distributive Labels, New York, N.Y. 2001

National Director of Retail - Columbia Records, New York, N.Y. 1990

Northeast Regional Gospel Promoter - A&M Records, New York, N.Y. 1988-1990

Awards
From 1993 -1998, Manerson received multiple Platinum sales awards for artists including Michael Jackson, Babyface, Sade and Celine Dion, and soundtracks including Poetic Justice and Deep Cover.  
1997 - Citations from Michael Julian Bond.  
1996 - Awarded Key to the City of Atlanta during Olympics by Mayor Bill Campbell.  
1995 - Award from Atlanta Chapter of Songwriters Association.  
1995 - Sony Distribution Branch Award for Sales.  
1992 - Epic/Sony Promotion Man of the Year Award.   
1991 - Epic/Sony Promotion Man of the Year Award.

References

Chatman, Priscilla. ""Al Moses Manerson Biography."" PSI NORTH-SOUTH PARTNERS, INC. Retrieved: 1 May 2011.
Greene, Toni. "Al Moses Manerson Biography." PSI NORTH-SOUTH PARTNERS, INC. Retrieved: 1 May 2011.
Edmonds, Kevon. Recording Artist. Retrieved: 1 May 2011

Fitchburg State University alumni
Living people
Talent managers
Year of birth missing (living people)